Edgar Pierre Joseph Tinel (27 March 185428 October 1912) was a Belgian composer and pianist.

He was born in Sinaai, today part of Sint-Niklaas in East Flanders, Belgium, and died in Brussels. After studies at the Brussels Conservatory with Louis Brassin (piano) and François-Auguste Gevaert (composition), he began a career as a virtuoso, but soon abandoned this for composition. In 1877 his cantata Klokke Roeland won him the Belgian Prix de Rome, and in 1881 he succeeded Jacques-Nicolas Lemmens as director of the Mechelen Institute of Religious Music.

He devoted himself to a study of old church music, and his ideas gave rise to Pope Pius X's Motu proprio. Appointed inspector of music education in 1889, he moved to the Brussels Conservatory to become professor of counterpoint and fugue in 1896, and director at the end of 1908. He was made maître de chapelle to the king in 1910, having been elected to the Belgian Royal Academy in 1902.

His liturgical music is polyphonic in the Palestrina style, but this technique conflicted with Tinel's lyrical and mystical temperament, and he had much greater success in his two concert settings of the Te Deum, the oratorio and the religious dramas. These works indicate his total admiration for Bach, but the orchestration, dominated by the strings, is Romantic. Tinel's piano pieces and songs recall Schumann, Mendelssohn and Brahms. He published Le chant gregorien (Mechelen, 1890).

Work

Operas 
Godelieve, Op. 43
Katharina, Op. 44

Choral 
Klokke Roeland, Op. 17, cantata
Kollebloemen, Op. 20, cantata, 1879, rev. 1889–90
Vlaamsche stemme, Op. 25, 4 male vv
Te Deum, Op. 26, 4vv org, 1883
Psalm vi, Op. 27, 4 male vv 1891
4 Adventsliederen, Op. 35, SATB
Franciscus, Op. 36, oratorio, 1890, libretto by Lodewijk de Koninck
Aurora, Op. 37, 4 male vv (1885)
Psalm xxix, Op. 39, 4 male vv
Missa in honorem BMV de Lourdes, Op. 41, 5 vv 1892
Cantique nuptial, Op. 45, S/T, org, pf/harp
Te Deum, Op. 46, 6vv, org, orch, 1905
Psalm cl, Op. 47, 4 male vv, 1907

Keyboard music 
Four Nocturnes (voice and piano), Op.1
Three Fantasy Pieces, Op. 2
Scherzo in C minor, Op. 3
Two Pieces, Op.7
Piano Sonata in F minor, Op. 9
Au Printemps, Five Fantasy Pieces, Op. 14
Piano Sonata in G minor, Op. 15
Organ Sonata in G minor, Op. 29
Bunte Blätter, six pieces for piano, Op. 32

Orchestral music, songs 

 Principal publishers: Breitkopf & Härtel, Schott (Brussels)
Kollebloemen (lyrical poem)
Drie ridders ('Three knights', ballad)
 Incidental music to Pierre Corneille's Polyeucte (1878–1881)

Tinel also wrote a treatise on plain-song.

Honours 
 1900: Officer in the Order of Leopold.

See also 
 Joseph Ryelandt

References 

 E. Closson: Sainte Godelieve de E. Tinel (Leipzig, 1879) 
 A. van der Elst: Edgar Tinel (Ghent, 1901) 
 P. Tinel: Edgar Tinel: Le recit de sa vie et I'eregese de son oeuvre de 1854 a 1886 (Brussels, 1923) 
 Le 'Franciscus' d'Edgar Tinel (Brussels, 1926) 
 Edgar Tinel (Brussels, 1946) J. Ryelandt: 'Notice sur Edgar Tinel', Annuaire de I'Academie royale de Belgique, cxvi (1950), 207 
 C. van den Borren: Geschiedenis van de muziek in de Nederlanden, ii (Antwerp, 1951), 239ff, 287ff, 335f, 367f 
 F. van der Mueren: 'Edgar Tinel', Musica sacra, 1xiii (1962), 113 
 J. Vyverman: 'Tinel, Edgar', BNB
 Hugo Riemann, Musik-Lexikon, 9th ed., Max Hellers Verlag, Berlin, 1919. 
 S.A.M Bottenheim, Prisma Encyclopedie der Muziek, Het Spectrum, Utrecht, 1957. 
 Sylvia van Ameringen, Elseviers Encyclopedie van de muziek, Elsevier, Amsterdam, 1962. 
 Percy A. Scholes, John Owen Ward, The Oxford Companion to Music, 10th ed., Oxford University * Press, London, 1974.
 New Groves Dictionary (1981), Volume 18

External links
 Edgar (Pierre Joseph) Tinel | Classical Composers Database at www.classical-composers.org
 
  Site of the Royal Conservatory of Brussels – Koninklijk Conservatorium Brussel (Flemish section)
  Site of museum of Edgar Tinel at Sinaai-Waas, Belgium

1854 births
1912 deaths
19th-century classical composers
19th-century classical pianists
20th-century classical composers
20th-century classical pianists
Belgian classical composers
Belgian classical pianists
Belgian male classical composers
Belgian opera composers
Belgian Roman Catholics
Classical composers of church music
Flemish composers
Male opera composers
Prix de Rome (Belgium) winners
People from Sint-Niklaas
Male classical pianists
20th-century Belgian male musicians
19th-century Belgian male musicians
Oratorio composers